Zahoor Sofi (born 2 May 1987) is an Indian first-class cricketer who played for Jammu & Kashmir. He played in six first-class, seventeen List A and five Twenty20 matches between 2008 and 2016. Following his playing career, he became a member of the organising committee for cricket trials in Kashmir.

References

External links
 

1987 births
Living people
Indian cricketers
Jammu and Kashmir cricketers
People from Srinagar